Anthony Joseph "Chef Tony" Notaro (born November 5, 1954) is an advertising pitchman for cooking and kitchen products, seen primarily on infomercials and home shopping channels.

Biography
He was born in Brooklyn, New York to first generation Italian-Americans.  His informal chef training includes working in his grandmother's Southern Italian restaurant in lower Manhattan. His father sold fresh produce from a horse and wagon, and his mother ran a home-based Italian catering business.

At age 16, Notaro began developing his own culinary products after school in a neighborhood pizzeria. At age 18 he became an assistant to a salesman demonstrating kitchen products in a local Brooklyn store. Notaro began demonstrating the Popeil Dial-O-Matic throughout New York City.  Eventually chosen as the first person to demonstrate T-Fal cookware in the U.S.  He was awarded 2002 best male demonstrator for Miracle Blade III and 2004 Best kitchen product for the Ultimate Chopper by the Electronic Retailers Association. He is a regular guest on the QVC Shopping Channel as well as Ideal World in England.

Products
He is most noted for selling the patented Miracle Blades, and the TastiWave. Tony also endorses the Ultimate Chopper (in an infomercial co-hosted by Jenilee Harrison). He also endorses Smartware bakeware, which is made of non-stick "Temperflex" silicone, SmartLidz, Wonder Cooker, Brown & Crisp, Funnel Cake Kit, and a dozen more products.

Products from Genius
 Salad Chef Smart
 Cerafit Gold Edition
 Cerafit Fusion (with the lotus-effect)
 Nicer Dicer Plus
 Nicer Dicer Fusion
 Nicer Dicer Cube

References

External links
ChefTonyTV.com
Chef Tony of Facebook
Chef Tony on Twitter
Review of the Miracle Blade
Chef Tony (web.archive.org)

1954 births
Living people
Television personalities from New York City
American salespeople
People from Brooklyn
American people of Italian descent
Infomercials